Niwy may refer to the following places:
Niwy, Bydgoszcz County in Kuyavian-Pomeranian Voivodeship (north-central Poland)
Niwy, Sępólno County in Kuyavian-Pomeranian Voivodeship (north-central Poland)
Niwy, Bełchatów County in Łódź Voivodeship (central Poland)
Niwy, Piotrków County in Łódź Voivodeship (central Poland)
Niwy, Świętokrzyskie Voivodeship (south-central Poland)
Niwy, Gmina Herby in Silesian Voivodeship (south Poland)
Niwy, Gmina Woźniki in Silesian Voivodeship (south Poland)
Niwy, Lubusz Voivodeship (west Poland)
Niwy, West Pomeranian Voivodeship (north-west Poland)